Anzia flavotenuis is a species of lichenised ascomycete of the genus Anzia in the large family Parmeliaceae. It is endemic to Sri Lanka. The species is characterized by two-layered medulla with a yellow upper layer and white lower layer. The isidia have brown-black tips.

References

Parmeliaceae
Lichen species
Lichens of Sri Lanka
Lichens described in 2012
Taxa named by André Aptroot